Madison Township is the name of some places in the U.S. state of Pennsylvania:

 Madison Township, Armstrong County, Pennsylvania
 Madison Township, Clarion County, Pennsylvania
 Madison Township, Columbia County, Pennsylvania
 Madison Township, Lackawanna County, Pennsylvania

See also 
 Madison, Pennsylvania, a borough in Westmoreland county
 Northeast Madison Township, Perry County, Pennsylvania
 Southwest Madison Township, Perry County, Pennsylvania
 Madison Township (disambiguation)

Pennsylvania township disambiguation pages